Muqarnas is an annual academic journal of the Aga Khan Program for Islamic Architecture at Harvard University and the Massachusetts Institute of Technology. The journal was established in 1983 and focuses on Islamic architecture and visual arts, and has become established as "perhaps the leading journal" in English in the field. Oleg Grabar was among the founders.

The journal's name, muqarnas, is a decorative device in traditional Islamic and Persian architecture.

References

External links
 
 Volumes 1–30 (1983–2013)

Art history journals
Visual art journals
Islamic art
Islamic architecture
Architecture journals
Annual journals
Publications established in 1983
English-language journals
Brill Publishers academic journals
Aga Khan Trust for Culture projects